Mark Hale is an American linguistics professor now teaching at Concordia University in Montreal, Quebec, Canada. He studies the methodology of historical linguistics as well as theoretical linguistics, Indo-European and Austronesian linguistics.

He is a prominent figure in these fields. He has published numerous scholarly articles  and books  on his research. Along with colleague Charles Reiss, he is a proponent of substance-free phonology, the idea that phonetic substance is inaccessible to phonological computation.

Selected publications
Hale, M. (2007), Historical linguistics: Theory and method, Oxford, Blackwell

Hale, M., & Reiss, C. (2008),The Phonological Enterprise, Oxford: Oxford University Press

Hale, M., Kissock, M., & Reiss, C. (2014) An I-Language Approach to Phonologization and Lexification. Chapter  20.	
The Oxford Handbook of Historical Phonology.
Edited by Patrick Honeybone and Joseph Salmons

Hale, M. (1998). Diachronic syntax. Syntax, 1(1), 1-18.

Hale, M.,(2004) Neogrammarian Sound Change, Chapter 7 in The Handbook of Historical Linguistics, Edited by: Brian D. Joseph and Richard D. Janda, Blackwell

Mark Hale & Charles Reiss (2000) Substance abuse and dysfunctionalism: Current trends in phonology. Linguistic Inquiry 31: 157–169.

References

Year of birth missing (living people)
Living people
Linguists from the United States
Linguists from Canada
Academic staff of Concordia University
People educated at Croesyceiliog School